David Cooper Templeton (born 7 January 1989) is a Scottish  professional footballer who currently plays as a winger for Drumchapel United

Templeton played for Stenhousemuir, Raith Rovers, Heart of Midlothian, Hamilton Academical, Rangers and Burton Albion. He has represented Scotland at under-19 and under-21 levels.

Club career

Stenhousemuir
Templeton started his senior career with Third Division side Stenhousemuir in 2005. He made 36 first team appearances for the club, scoring 11 goals all of which were in league fixtures.

Heart of Midlothian
Tenpleton signed for Heart of Midlothian in January 2007. During the second half of the 2007–08 season he was loaned out to Second Division side Raith Rovers. Templeton made his first team debut as a substitute against Aberdeen in a goalless draw at Pittodrie. His first start came against Celtic at Parkhead on the final day of the 2008–09 season. Templeton then spent a period out of action due to foot injuries. He made his first appearance of the 2009–10 season on 20 December 2009 against Celtic, setting up the winning goal in a 2–1 victory, crossing the ball for Ismael Bouzid to score. On 21 February 2010, Templeton scored his first goal for Hearts, the second in a 2–0 defeat of Hamilton Academical. Since then, Templeton frequently found himself on the scoresheet, scoring a number of memorable efforts, none more so than a spectacular dribble and finish in the first Edinburgh derby of the 2010–11 season.

Templeton received high praise from Terry Butcher after Hearts 1–1 draw with Inverness Caledonian Thistle. Templeton was nominated for PFA Player of the Year for the 2010–11 season. He also won the Hearts Fans Player of the year. Templeton's final goal for Hearts came in the 2012–13 UEFA Europa League play-off round second leg against Liverpool at Anfield on 28 August 2012.

Rangers
On 31 August 2012, Templeton signed a four-year contract for Third Division club Rangers for an undisclosed fee (reported to be approximately £700,000). His first game for Rangers ended in a 5–1 victory against Elgin City with Templeton scoring two goals. Templeton scored 15 goals in his first season at Rangers. In May 2016, Templeton was released after reaching the end of his contract, which was not renewed after he made only three appearances in his final season with Rangers.

Templeton spent the rest of 2016 without a club. He turned down a move to newly promoted Scottish League Two side Edinburgh City in November, and trained with Dundee United in February 2017. He also had a trial spell with Major League Soccer side Vancouver Whitecaps FC.

Hamilton Academical
On 24 March 2017, Templeton signed for Scottish Premiership side Hamilton Academical on a deal until the end of the season. He made his debut for the club on 13 May 2017, as a substitute in a 1–0 home defeat against Motherwell. In the following match, he scored his first goal as Hamilton lost 3–2 away at Ross County. On 19 May 2017, Templeton signed a new contract, keeping him at Hamilton until the end of the 2017–18 season. He was one of seven first-team players released by Hamilton at the end of the 2017–18 season.

Burton Albion
Templeton signed a two-year contract with EFL League One club Burton Albion in July 2018. He left the club by mutual consent on 31 January 2020.

Hamilton Academical (second spell)
After leaving Burton on 31 January 2020, Templeton returned to Hamilton Academical. In May 2020 he signed a two-year extension to his contract. Having made ten appearances in the 2020–21 season by mid-October 2020, he then sustained an injury and did not feature again in that campaign, which ended in relegation for Accies  after several other members of their small squad also missed long periods due to injury.

Retirement

On 24 November 2021, Templeton announced his retirement from professional football aged 32.

International career
Templeton made two appearances each for Scotland at under-19 level and under-21 level.

Personal life
Templeton's father is former professional footballer Henry Templeton, who at the time of David's birth was playing for ex-Scotland manager, Ally MacLeod, at Ayr United. Henry's hero was Rangers and Scotland winger Davie Cooper, and he named his son after his hero. In an interview in 2010 with The Scotsman, Templeton said of his childhood, "My dad left and I went to my mum's side who were all Celtic fans so I ended up following them. I got a bit of stick when I was younger but I obviously don't bother about the Old Firm any more."

Career statistics

Honours

Club
Rangers
Scottish League One: 2013–14
Scottish Third Division: 2012–13

Individual
Scottish Premiership Player of the Month: November 2017
Scottish Premier League Young Player of the Month: November 2010, December 2010

References

External links

1989 births
Living people
Footballers from Glasgow
Scottish footballers
Scotland youth international footballers
Scotland under-21 international footballers
Association football forwards
Stenhousemuir F.C. players
Heart of Midlothian F.C. players
Raith Rovers F.C. players
Rangers F.C. players
Hamilton Academical F.C. players
Burton Albion F.C. players
Scottish Premier League players
Scottish Football League players
Scottish Professional Football League players
English Football League players